Lusth is a surname. Notable people with the surname include:

 Mats Lusth (born 1962), Swedish ice hockey player and coach
 Ozzy Lusth (born 1981), American reality show veteran contestant

See also
 Lush (surname)